Dale Rutledge is an American politician.

Early life 
Rutledge was born in Henry County, Georgia. Rutledge grew up on a family farm.

Education 
Rutledge attended Georgia Southwestern University.

Career 
Rutledge is a businessman. In 1999, Rutledge became the owner and President of Expo-Link Cargo, a company in the trade show business for logistic industry.

In 2012, Rutledge's political career began when he was first elected as the Georgia House of Representatives for district 109. Rutledge defeated Republican incumbent Steve Davis.

In 2013, Rutledge became the Vice President of J&P Hall Express.

In 2020, Rutledge was defeated in his reelection attempt for district 109.

Personal life 
Dale has two daughters; Caroline & Morgan and one son Grant. He also has five grandchildren.

References

External links 
Dale Rutledge at house.ga.gov
Dale Rutledge at ballotpedia.org
 Dale Rutledge's at open states.org

Living people
Republican Party members of the Georgia House of Representatives
Year of birth missing (living people)
21st-century American politicians